Nelma may refer to:

 Nelma (Stenodus nelma), commercial freshwater whitefish
 Nelma, Wisconsin, United States